Georgi Karakashev (23 April 1899 – 11 August 1970) was a Bulgarian artist. His work was part of the art competition at the 1932 Summer Olympics.

References

1899 births
1970 deaths
Bulgarian artists
Olympic competitors in art competitions
People from Ruse, Bulgaria